The EMD DD35A, also known as the EMD DDA35, was a  diesel-electric locomotive of D-D wheel arrangement built by General Motors Electro-Motive Division exclusively for the Union Pacific Railroad. They were a cab-equipped variant of the previous, cabless booster (B unit) EMD DD35 (sometimes erroneously called the 'DD35B'). Fifteen DD35A locomotives were built between May and July 1965; they were assigned road numbers 70 through 84. This request also led to the introduction of the ALCO Century 855 and GE U50. A further development of the 8 axle, twin-engined locomotive produced the final, best known type, the DDA40X "Centennial".

History
Like its cabless predecessor, the DD35A was essentially two EMD GP35 locomotives on a common frame, riding on a pair of 4-axle Flexicoil trucks. The cab of a GP35 was fitted to the front end, requiring a longer frame than the DD35; the fuel tank beneath was lengthened, and the center pass-through walkway was offset a little to the rear because of the single cab. Another difference was that the DD35A was fitted with the new flared radiator section EMD was testing on its EMD 645-engined demonstrators (the prototype SD40 demonstrators).

The DD35s were initially quite unreliable; some of this was blamed on sand from the internal sandboxes getting in electrical gear, so new sandboxes were fitted on the walkways in 1969. The DD35s were among the last EMD road units to be built with DC generators and old-fashioned switchgear, which were more maintenance intensive than the later AC/DC equipment.

Once teething troubles had been overcome, the DD35s were reasonably successful, but they were less flexible than smaller units and thus with the economic downturn of the early 1980s they were withdrawn from service. They spent their final months of service operating around Salt Lake City, Utah before their retirement by 1981. No examples of the DD35 type were preserved.

Original buyers

See also
 EMD DD35
 EMD DDA40X
 EMD DDM45
 ALCO Century 855
 GE U50C

References 
 
 
 

Diesel-electric locomotives of the United States
DD35A
Union Pacific Railroad locomotives
D-D locomotives
Railway locomotives introduced in 1965
Scrapped locomotives
Freight locomotives
Standard gauge locomotives of the United States